Gephyromantis silvanus, commonly known as the Madagascar frog, is a species of frogs in the family Mantellidae.  It is endemic to Madagascar.  Its natural habitats are subtropical or tropical moist lowland forest and rivers.  It is threatened by habitat loss.

Sources

silvanus
Amphibians described in 1997
Endemic frogs of Madagascar
Taxonomy articles created by Polbot